is a private university in Okayama, Okayama, Japan. The predecessor of the school, Sanyo Eiwa Women's School, was founded in 1886, and was chartered as a junior college, Sanyo Gakuen College in 1969. The four-year college, Sanyo Gakuen University, was established in 1994.

External links
  

Educational institutions established in 1994
Christian universities and colleges in Japan
Private universities and colleges in Japan
Universities and colleges in Okayama Prefecture
1994 establishments in Japan